Erin Jackson (born September 19, 1992) is an American speed skater, roller derby player, and Olympic gold medalist. Jackson is the first Black woman to win a Winter Olympic gold medal in an individual sport. She qualified for The World Games 2017 in Wroclaw, Poland, where she competed in inline speed skating in various distances on road and track. She also qualified to compete in the 500 meters long track speed skating event at the 2018 Winter Olympics in Pyeongchang.

In November 2021 she won her first 500 meters Speedskating World Cup races in Poland with two track records, making her the first Black American woman to win in the World Cup.

On February 13, 2022, Jackson won the gold medal in the Women's 500m speed skating event at the 2022 Beijing Winter Olympics. She is the first Black American woman to medal in speed skating.

Early life and education
Erin Jackson was born in Ocala, Florida to Tracy and Rita Jackson. She has one brother. Jackson first skated at eight years old when she tried figure skating. Jackson attended Shores Christian Academy, Howard Middle School, and Forest High School. She then went on to the University of Florida, where she graduated with honors from the Materials Science & Engineering program.

Career
Jackson won gold in the 500-m inline skating race at the 2008–09 Junior World Championships, gold in the same event at the 2014 Pan American Championships, and was named United States Olympic Committee Female Athlete of the Year for Roller Sports in 2012 and 2013. She also competes in roller derby with the Jacksonville RollerGirls of the Women's Flat Track Derby Association (WFTDA), earning the MVP award at the 2014 WFTDA Division 1 Playoff in Evansville, Indiana, and advancing to WFTDA Championships in both 2015 and 2016.

In 2016, Erin Jackson transitioned to speed skating on the ice. She qualified for the 2018 Winter Olympics with only four months of experience in speedskating on ice. Coached by Renee Hildebrand, Jackson qualified at the 500-meter distance, and finished 24th out of 31 competitors in Pyeongchang.

Jackson won the gold medal in the Women's 500-meter speed skating event at the  2022 Winter Olympics in Beijing, China, racing in the 14th pairing (out of 15) and besting the field by 0.08 seconds with a time of 37.04 seconds. She had nearly missed out on qualifying for the Olympics after slipping during the U.S. Trials in this event. Her teammate and longtime friend Brittany Bowe won the event but gave up her spot for Jackson to qualify. Jackson became the first Black woman to win a Winter Olympic gold in an individual sport. Jackson also is the first American woman to win an Olympic speed skating gold since Chris Witty in 1000m in 2002, and the first American woman to win the women's 500m since Bonnie Blair in 1994.

Honors and awards
 Sports Illustrated, Fittest 50: 2022 (#24)

References

External links

 
 

1992 births
Living people
American female speed skaters
Inline speed skaters
Roller derby skaters
Olympic gold medalists for the United States in speed skating
Speed skaters at the 2018 Winter Olympics
Speed skaters at the 2022 Winter Olympics
Medalists at the 2022 Winter Olympics
Roller speed skaters at the 2015 Pan American Games
University of Florida alumni
Sportspeople from Ocala, Florida
Pan American Games silver medalists for the United States
Pan American Games medalists in roller skating
Competitors at the 2017 World Games
Medalists at the 2015 Pan American Games
World Single Distances Speed Skating Championships medalists
20th-century American women
21st-century American women